In common law in the United States, the family purpose doctrine is a rule that holds the owner of an automobile liable for damages to others while a member of the family is driving the vehicle, regardless of whether or not the owner gave permission.  The underlying theory is that the vehicle is owned for family purposes.

Overview
In the US, this is primarily a state-level rule with considerable variation in its application.  For example, in Arizona, the family purpose doctrine is applied very broadly and holds parents liable even for the negligence of a child driving a motor vehicle in defiance of driving restrictions placed upon him.  In Georgia, the 'family purpose' liability extends to third parties allowed by the teenage driver to operate the car.  Georgia also extends the rule to adult children in some cases and explicitly extends the rule to family boats.

In Colorado, on the other hand, the same term is used to describe joint and several liability for household bills.

References

American legal terminology